Sri Lankans in Lebanon refer to people from Sri Lanka living in Lebanon. There are approximately 80,000 to 90,000 of them.    Sri Lankans generally go to the Middle East to find work, with a large domestic labour population in Lebanon.

History
A large influx of Sri Lankan women into Lebanon had begun in the early 1990s, serving primarily as domestic labour in private households. Like  other countries the Sri Lankan government has actively encouraged the 'export' of domestic labour as it has become the largest single source of foreign revenue for the country. However recently most Sri Lankan domestic workers have fallen under the category of 'contract slavery', given the legal and employment conditions they face.

References

External links
 Another 1000 Sri Lankans to be repatriated from Lebanon this week

Asian diaspora in Lebanon
Ethnic groups in Lebanon
 
Lebanon